Chalu Pol (also Romanized as Chālū Pol; also known as Chalapur, Chāleh Pol, and Chalvil) is a village in Mehravan Rural District, in the Central District of Neka County, Mazandaran Province, Iran. At the 2006 census, its population was 1,678, in 417 families.

References 

Populated places in Neka County